James T. McLean (1881–?) was a Scottish professional footballer who played as a full back.

References

1881 births
Year of death unknown
Scottish footballers
Association football fullbacks
Bradford City A.F.C. players
Leyton Orient F.C. players
Burnley F.C. players
English Football League players
Clachnacuddin F.C. players